Cricket is a census-designated place (CDP) located between Wilkesboro and North Wilkesboro in Wilkes County, North Carolina, United States. The population was 2,053 at the 2000 census.

Geography
Cricket is located at  (36.162968, -81.183077).

Cricket has many rolling hills, similar to the surrounding townships.

Demographics

As of the census of 2000, there were 2,053 people, 862 households, and 581 families residing in the CDP. The population density was 514.7 people per square mile (198.7/km2). There were 951 housing units at an average density of 238.4/sq mi (92.0/km2). The racial makeup of the CDP was 92.30% White, 0.34% African American, 0.15% Native American, 0.10% Asian, 6.87% from other races, and 0.24% from two or more races. Hispanic or Latino of any race were 6.81% of the population.

There were 862 households, out of which 25.8% had children under the age of 18 living with them, 51.6% were married couples living together, 9.2% had a female householder with no husband present, and 32.5% were non-families. 28.9% of all households were made up of individuals, and 11.5% had someone living alone who was 65 years of age or older. The average household size was 2.38 and the average family size was 2.85.

In the CDP, the population was spread out, with 19.6% under the age of 18, 9.8% from 18 to 24, 30.2% from 25 to 44, 24.4% from 45 to 64, and 16.0% who were 65 years of age or older. The median age was 38 years. For every 100 females, there were 104.5 males. For every 100 females age 18 and over, there were 107.2 males.

The median income for a household in the CDP was $27,017, and the median income for a family was $33,148. Males had a median income of $25,720 versus $16,822 for females. The per capita income for the CDP was $12,989. About 9.7% of families and 13.4% of the population were below the poverty line, including 21.5% of those under age 18 and 5.7% of those age 65 or over.

Infrastructure
A Citgo gas station is located in Cricket with a convenience store titled the Grocery Bag, Inc. as well as a small hair salon titled Hair Country. Across from the gas station is Cricket Volunteer Fire Department. Along the main road, Boone Trail/Old 421, is a non-denominational church Celebration Church as well as Harmony Baptist Church. H & H Auto Sales is a small car dealership and the only one within Cricket. David's Market is a produce shop at the light in Cricket beside of Lyall's Bike Shop, a motorcycle bike shop. Along another road connecting Cricket and North Wilkesboro, Suncrest Orchard Road, there are also the churches SONcrest Outreach and Welcome Home Baptist Church.

There are no major roads in Cricket, however, Cricket has previously had NC-16, NC-60, as well as US-421 run through what is now the main road, Boone Trail. While there is no scheduled transportation in Cricket, one can request for the Wilkes Transportation Authority to pick  up or drop off customers for $4-$5.

References

Census-designated places in North Carolina
Census-designated places in Wilkes County, North Carolina